Phoberus capensis is a beetle of the family Trogidae.

References

capensis
Beetles described in 1979